Trichet is a French surname. Notable people with the surname include:

 Jean-Claude Trichet (born 1942), French banker
 Marie Louise Trichet (1684–1759), French Catholic sister

French-language surnames